Pacific Division, better known as Pac Div is an American rap quartet from Southern California. Formed by brothers Like and Mibbs, Pac Div started rapping together in high school. Originally an eleven-member crew, they shrank to three in 2005 when it became apparent a group with that many members wasn't feasible.

Career
Pac Div's first mixtape, Sealed for Freshness: The Blend Tape, along with their first video, F.A.T Boys, was released in 2006 to critic acclaim. Focusing on their lives as regular, young men growing up in Southern California, their music resonated with youth from all walks of life. This universal appeal was the catalyst for their success and garnered them the real estate in numerous famed magazines, including Billboard, Rolling Stone, The Source, VIBE and XXL. It also gained the approval of hip-hop hotshots Ludacris, ?uestlove, Pharrell Williams, Talib Kweli, 9th Wonder and more. Their continued success drew international attention as they opened for big names like Nas, Q-Tip, Busta Rhymes, Ice-T, Ludacris and N.E.R.D.

A few years following the release of Sealed for Freshness: The Blend Tape, the group dropped two more mixtapes, Church League Champions and Don't Mention It. Church League Champions featured the now classic, "Mayor", while Don't Mention It contained the fan favorite, "Don't Forget the Swishers," featuring rapper Chip tha Ripper. In the Spring of 2011, the trio teamed up with Grand Hustle Management and released their fourth mixtape, Mania!, hosted by DJ Don Cannon, featuring the hit single, “Anti-freeze”. With over a million downloads, Mania! is their most successful mixtape to date.

In 2011, Pac Div left Motown Universal and released their debut album, The Div independently through their own label, The Div and RBC Records. With features from longtime friends, Blu Collar, Asher Roth, Casey Veggies and Skeme, the album was hailed as a huge success. Additionally, Pac Div appeared in their first nationally televised commercial for Phiten Athletics, featuring the group’s performance of their original song, Flexin, as well as appearances by NBA stars Carmelo Anthony, Chris Bosh, Eric Gordon and Derrick Williams.
The group closed out the year, touring with Mac Miller on his BlueSlide Park Tour.  As 2012 came to a close, Pac Div released their second album, G.M.B, on November 27, 2012 with features from Mac Miller and Kendrick Lamar and production from Scoop DeVille, Swiff D, DJ Dahi and the group’s own, Like. The group wrapped up the year touring Snoop Dogg and look forward to their upcoming Spring 2013 tour with Johnny Polygon.

Discography
Studio albums
The DiV (2011)
GMB (2012)
First Baptist (2018)

EPs
Pac Div EP (2009)
Mixtapes
Sealed for Freshness: The Blend Tape (2006)
Church League Champions (2009)
Don't Mention It (2010)
Mania! (2011)

References

External links
 Official Web Site

Musical groups established in 2002
Hip hop groups from California
Rappers from Los Angeles
Underground hip hop groups
Musical groups from Los Angeles
2002 establishments in California
Universal Motown Records artists